Moon Mi-ra (born 28 February 1992) is a South Korean footballer who plays as a midfielder for Suwon FC and the South Korea national team.

International career
Moon played eleven matches for the South Korea U20 team between 2008 and 2012, scoring five goals. She was a member of the squad that finished third in the 2010 FIFA U-20 Women's World Cup and reached the quarter-finals of the  2012 FIFA U-20 Women's World Cup. She made her full international debut on 4 June 2016 in a friendly against Myanmar and scored her first goal in her third cap against Guam on 8 November 2016.

International goals

References

External links

1992 births
Living people
South Korean women's footballers
South Korea women's international footballers
2019 FIFA Women's World Cup players
WK League players
Women's association football midfielders
Footballers at the 2018 Asian Games
Asian Games bronze medalists for South Korea
Asian Games medalists in football
Medalists at the 2018 Asian Games